BWK is the abbreviation of:

 Berwick-upon-Tweed railway station, a railway station in Northumberland, England, National Rail station code
 Bol Airport or Brač Airport, an airport on the Croatian island of Brač, close to the town of Bol, IATA code 
 Brandon Wheat Kings, a Western Hockey League team based in Brandon, Manitoba.
 Brian Wilson Kernighan, a computer scientist
 Brillouin–Wentzel–Kramers approximation, a method for approximating many common differential equations in physics.
 Brunswick, Georgia
 Bund Westdeutscher Kommunisten, see League of West German Communists, was a Maoist communist political organization in the Federal Republic of Germany, active between 1980 and 1995
 Cold desert climate or cool arid climate